Tanycytes are special ependymal cells found in the third ventricle of the brain, and on the floor of the fourth ventricle and have processes extending deep into the hypothalamus. It is possible that their function is to transfer chemical signals from the cerebrospinal fluid to the central nervous system.

The term tanycyte comes from the Greek word tanus which means elongated.

Structure
Tanycytes share some features with radial glial cells and astrocytes. Their form and location have led some authors to regard them as radial glial cells that remain in the hypothalamus throughout life. This has led some to believe that these cells share the same lineage.

Even so, tanycytes also display certain characteristics that distinguish them from radial glia cells. Tanycytes in rats begin to develop in the last two days of gestation and continue on until they reach their full differentiation in the first month of life. Radial glia cells on the other hand, are a key component of the embryonic brain. Tanycytes also contain many proteins not found in radial glia cells. Thus, evidence now suggests that tanycytes are genealogical descendants of radial glia cells that do not develop into astrocytes, but rather into their own subpopulation.

Location
Tanycytes in adult mammals are found in the ventricular system and the circumventricular organs. They are most numerous in the third ventricle of the brain, are also found in the fourth ventricle, and can also be seen in the spinal cord radiating from the ependyma of the central canal to the spinal cord surface. Tanycytes represent approximately 0.6% of the population of the lateral ventricular wall.

Tanycytes have also been shown in vivo to serve as a diet-responsive neurogenic niche.

Function
Recent work suggests that tanycyte cells bridge the gap between the central nervous system (CNS) via cerebrospinal fluid (CSF) to the hypophyseal portal blood. This may also link the CSF to neuroendocrine events.

Role in the release of gonadotropin-releasing hormone
Researches in 2005 and 2010 found that tanycytes participate in the release of gonadotropin-releasing hormone (GnRH). GnRH is released by neurons located in the rostral hypothalamus. These nerve fibers are concentrated in the region that exactly matches the distribution of β1 tanycytes. β1 and β2 tanycytes are found nearer the arcuate nucleus and the median eminence.

Currently, it is thought that there are two different mechanisms by which tanycytes participate in the release of GnRH. One includes the cyclic remodeling of the spatial relationship between GnRH terminals, the tanycytes, and the perivascular space. The second is the cell to cell signaling mechanism mediated by specific tanycyte compounds. Recent evidence supports both mechanisms, and also the possibility that both are part of a single mechanism.

History
The term tanycyte was coined by Horstmann in 1954 when he described a distinct structural feature of the cell, which is a single, long basal process that projects to a distinct region of the hypothalamus.

During the 1970s and 1980s, tanycytes were the subject of many research publications, ranging from their morphology to function. But the lack of advanced methodological tools stalled research and led to disagreements between researchers about the full role of tanycytes. Recent advances in immunocytochemistry have allowed for new research in this area.

References

Bibliography

External links

http://www.lab.anhb.uwa.edu.au/mb140/CorePages/Nervous/Nervous.htm
NIF Search - Tanycyte via the Neuroscience Information Framework

Nervous tissue cells